All Is Possible in Granada refers to:

 All Is Possible in Granada (1954 film), Spanish film
 All Is Possible in Granada (1982 film), remake of the 1954 film